Settimio Borsari (died 29 April 1594) was a Roman Catholic prelate who served as Bishop of Casale Monferrato (1592–1594) and Bishop of Alessano (1591–1592).

Biography
On 20 November 1591, Settimio Borsari was appointed Bishop of Alessano by Pope Innocent IX. On 30 November 1591, he was consecrated bishop by Girolamo Bernerio, Bishop of Ascoli Piceno, with Galeazzo Moroni, Bishop of Macerata e Tolentino, and Ottavio Abbiosi, Bishop of Pistoia, serving as co-consecrators. 

On 12 June 1592, he was appointed  Bishop of Casale Monferrato by Pope Clement VIII. He served as Bishop of Casale Monferrato until his death on 29 April 1594.

See also
Catholic Church in Italy

References

External links and additional sources
 (for Chronology of Bishops) 
 (for Chronology of Bishops) 
 (for Chronology of Bishops) 
 (for Chronology of Bishops)  

16th-century Italian Roman Catholic bishops
Bishops appointed by Pope Innocent IX
Bishops appointed by Pope Clement VIII
1594 deaths